Catfish Creek may refer to:

Creeks
 Catfish Creek (Florida) - see Allen David Broussard Catfish Creek Preserve State Park
 Catfish Creek (Iowa)
 Catfish Creek (Chartiers Creek tributary), a stream in Washington County, Pennsylvania
 Catfish Creek (Texas)
 Catfish Creek (Lake Erie, Elgin), in Ontario's Elgin County
 Catfish Creek (Lake Erie, Norfolk), a tributary to Ontario's Lynn River, in Norfolk County

Other
 Catfish Creek Baptist Church, Latta, South Carolina, on the National Register of Historic Places